Pleurothallis lamellaris is a species of orchid found from central Colombia to Bolivia.

References

External links 

lamellaris
Orchids of Bolivia
Orchids of Colombia